The Namco System 21 "Polygonizer"  is an arcade system board unveiled by Namco in 1988 with the game Winning Run. It was the first arcade board specifically designed for 3D polygon processing. The hardware went through significant evolution throughout its lifespan until the last game, Cyber Sled, was released in 1993. It was preceded by the Namco System 2 in 1987 and succeeded by the Namco System 22 in 1993.

System 21 specifications
The System 21 consists of four PCBs housed in a metal crate.

Main CPU: 2x Motorola 68000 @ 12.288 MHz
DSP (used for performing 3D math): 4x Texas Instruments TMS320C25  @ 24.576 MHz (Starblade uses 5xTMS320C20 instead)
Sound CPU: Motorola 6809 @ 3.072 MHz
Sound Chip: Yamaha YM2151 @ 3.58 MHz
MCU Hitachi HD63705 @ 2.048 MHz
 + Namco custom chips

Development
It was in development for over three years before release, since around the mid-1980s. According to Phil Harrison (in the September 1989 issue of Commodore User), who visited Namco's Tokyo office, Atari's Hard Drivin' ran on an earlier, less powerful, version of this hardware, stating that Namco and Atari Games were sister companies at the time and that the System 21 was a shared development.

List of Namco System 21 arcade games
Winning Run (1988)
Winning Run Suzuka Grand Prix (1989)
Galaxian³ (1990)
Driver's Eyes (1990)
Winning Run '91 (1991)
Starblade (1991)
Solvalou (1991) - 3D sequel to Xevious
Air Combat (1993)
Cyber Sled (1993)
Attack of the Zolgear (1994)

References

Namco arcade system boards